The Women's 50 metre backstroke competition of the 2019 African Games was held on 23 August 2019.

Records
Prior to the competition, the existing world and championship records were as follows.

Results

Heats
The heats were started on 23 August at 11:20.

Final

The final was started on 23 August at 17:00.

References

Women's 50 metre backstroke
2019 in women's swimming